Desi Slava is a Bulgarian singer, songwriter and producer. Popular in her home country, Desi Slava has produced material for ten albums, one single, and several music videos.

Albums

Studio albums

Compilations

Other albums

Video albums

Singles

Music videos

References

Discographies of Bulgarian artists